Korinos is a town and a former municipality in Pieria regional unit, Greece. Since the 2011 local government reform it is part of the municipality Katerini, of which it is a municipal unit. The municipal unit has an area of 70.909 km2, the community 30.726 km2. Korinos has approximately 5000 residents and it is located 5 km northeast of the city of Katerini (Κατερίνη), the capital of Pieria. Motorway 1 (Athens - Thessaloniki) is situated to the west. Korinos is famous for its beaches -lying to its east- and hotels in the area, which make the village an ideal place for tourism.

Additionally, Korinos has a public library since 2006.

Korinos became famous in Greece, after an economic scandal (during 2000) concerning the distribution of building grounds from Korinos' municipality to the villagers.

In Fascist Italy, rumours that the people of Korinos had "supernatural faculties" were taken seriously by some Italian racial theorists, who believed the town's inhabitants had successfully predicted the Italo-Ethiopian War.

Name
Although the word "Korinos" does not have any meaning in the Greek language and its origin is unknown, there are several different explanations for this name. According to one of them, Korinos was named after the many Korinia (Κορίνεια) trees existed in the area during its foundation (approximately1900). The second explanation is that Korinos was named after a general. Finally, some people believe that the name originates from the word "καρίνα" (keel), because Korinos Beach was a constructing place for keels.

Subdivisions
The municipal unit Korinos is subdivided into the following communities (constituent villages in brackets):
Kato Agios Ioannis
Korinos (Korinos, Paralia Korinou)
Koukkos
Nea Trapezounta
Sevasti

Historical population

History
Korinos was liberated by the Greek Army and after the end of the Balkan Wars, it finally became a part of Greece after nearly five centuries of Ottoman Rule.

Twinning cities
none

References

External links
Directory of Korinos

See also
List of settlements in the Pieria regional unit

Populated places in Pieria (regional unit)
Katerini